Mahmoud Mersal (born 16 December 1940) is an Egyptian flyweight boxer.

Career 
Mersal competed in the Flyweight division at the 1964 Summer Olympics in Tokyo, Japan. He secured 283 Total Judges point and lost the bout 5–0 to Fernando Atzori of Italy, as the latter went on to win the gold medal.

1964 Olympic results
Below is the record of Mahmoud Mersal, an Egyptian flyweight boxer who competed at the 1964 Tokyo Olympics:

 Round of 32: lost to Fernando Atzori (Italy) by decision, 0-5

References

1940 births
Living people
Boxers at the 1964 Summer Olympics
Egyptian male boxers
Olympic boxers of Egypt
Place of birth missing (living people)
Flyweight boxers